Moses Gomez de Mesquita (1688 – May 8, 1751) was ḥakham of the Spanish and Portuguese Jews of London.

Biography
Mesquite was born and trained in Amsterdam. He was appointed ḥakham in London in 1744, in succession to Isaac Nieto, who had resigned, and held the office until his death. He solemnized the second marriage of Isaac Nieto in 1747, and the marriage of his own daughter, in 1749, to Moses Cohen d'Azevedo, who became ḥakham in 1760.

He died on May 8, 1751 at the age of sixty-three. At his funeral, Nieto and Aaron Hart of the Great Synagogue gave graveside addresses.

Notes

References
 

1688 births
1751 deaths
18th-century British Sephardi Jews
English rabbis
English Sephardi Jews
Dutch emigrants to England
English people of Dutch-Jewish descent
Rabbis from Amsterdam